The Parc Clichy-Batignolles or Parc Clichy-Batignolles - Martin Luther King is a green space in Paris' 17th arrondissement (district). It is part of the  urban development project, which started in 2001, transforming  of land formerly occupied by freight yards for the French railway company SNCF. The name of the park is derived from: proximity to the site of a nineteenth century Porte de Clichy, a gate in Paris' Thiers wall that opened to the commune of Clichy, Hauts-de-Seine; proximity to the former SNCF Batignolles station; and a tribute to the legacy of slain civil rights leader Martin Luther King Jr.

Within the larger Clichy Batignolles project, the Parc Clichy-Batignolles - Martin Luther King will eventually cover , of which  had been opened to the public by 2014. When finished (scheduled for around 2015), it will be the largest green space in the 17th arrondissement, as well as the 8th largest park in Paris.

Access

As of 2014, the park has six entrance points from adjacent streets, at:
147 Cardinet Street (south)
151 Cardinet Street (south)
9 Bernard-Buffet Street (northeast)
36 Gilbert-Cesbron Street (north)
5 Colette-Heilbronner Lane (along Berthier Boulevard, northwest)
19 Colette-Heilbronner Lane (along Berthier Boulevard, northwest)

Entrances to the south-west of the park, on Mstislav-Rostropovitch Street, will be added when the park is fully open.

The nearest Métro stations are Porte de Clichy and Brochant, while the nearest Tram access is the Porte de Clichy stop on the 3b line.

Grounds and facilities
Sustainable principles underpin the design of the park, and features include low maintenance plants; solar panels and wind turbines; reconstituted materials for walkways and rainwater harvesting.

Recreation facilities include a skatepark, basketball courts and children's play area.

References

17th arrondissement of Paris
Memorials to Martin Luther King Jr.